Andrew Dodt (born 26 January 1986) is an Australian professional golfer who plays on the European Tour, Asian Tour, and PGA Tour of Australasia. He has won twice on the European Tour, in India and Thailand, both events co-sanctioned with the Asian Tour.

Amateur career
Dodt was born in Queensland, Australia and learned to play golf from the age of four at Gatton Golf Club, close to where he lived. He was a member of the Golf Australia National Squad and won many high-profile amateur tournaments including the 2007 Australian Amateur Stroke Play. That win gave Dodt a spot in the 2007 MFS Australian Open at The Australian Golf Club in December. He turned professional at the conclusion of that tournament.

Professional career
Dodt joined the Asian Tour for the 2008 season.finished his début season ranked 43rd on the Order of Merit, and improved to 15th in 2009. He won his first professional tournament at the 2010 Avantha Masters, which was co-sanctioned with the European Tour.

In 2015, Dodt won on the European Tour for the first time in five years at the True Thailand Classic, with a one stroke victory over Scott Hend and Thongchai Jaidee. He came from four shots behind in the final round with a five-under-par round to claim the victory. Dodt showed a return to form at the end of 2016, finishing runner-up in the Australian PGA Championship and tied for third in the UBS Hong Kong Open, in successive weeks. In 2017 he had some good results in important events, finishing tied for 6th place in the 2017 BMW PGA Championship and tied for 4th in the Aberdeen Asset Management Scottish Open. His good Scottish Open finish qualified him for the 2017 Open Championship where he finished tied for 44th place. 2018 was a disappointing year; his only top-10 finish being in the Fiji International.

Dodt injured his back in April 2019 and only returned to competitive golf in August at the Sarawak Championship. Dodt won the event after a playoff with Richard T. Lee. Dodt won with a birdie 4 at the first playoff hole. Earlier Lee had tied Dodt with an eagle 3 at the final hole.

Amateur wins
2003 Victorian Junior Masters
2006 Malaysian Amateur
2007 Australian Amateur Stroke Play

Professional wins (4)

European Tour wins (2)

1Co-sanctioned by the Asian Tour

Asian Tour wins (3)

1Co-sanctioned by the European Tour

Asian Tour playoff record (1–2)

PGA Tour of Australasia wins (1)

Results in major championships

"T" = Tied
Note: Dodt only played in The Open Championship.

Results in World Golf Championships
Results not in chronological order before 2015.

"T" = Tied

Team appearances
Amateur
Nomura Cup (representing Australia): 2005 (winners), 2007 (winners)
Bonallack Trophy (representing Asia/Pacific): 2006
Sloan Morpeth Trophy (representing Australia): 2007
Australian Men's Interstate Teams Matches (representing Queensland): 2003, 2004 (winners), 2005, 2006, 2007

See also
2014 European Tour Qualifying School graduates

References

External links

Australian male golfers
European Tour golfers
Asian Tour golfers
Golfers from Brisbane
Sportsmen from Queensland
1986 births
Living people